Krajno Pierwsze  is a village in the administrative district of Gmina Górno, within Kielce County, Świętokrzyskie Voivodeship, in south-central Poland.

The village has a population of 631.

References

Krajno Pierwsze
Kielce Governorate
Kielce Voivodeship (1919–1939)